Áine Hyland (née Donlon) is Emeritus Professor of Education and former Vice-President of University College Cork, Ireland.  She was born in 1942 in Athboy, Co. Meath and went to school in the Mercy Convent, Ballymahon, Co. Longford where she sat her Leaving Cert in 1959.   She was a civil servant in the Department of Education from 1959 to 1964, during which time she worked as a research assistant on the Investment in Education report.  She married Bill Hyland in 1964 and worked for a short period in the International Labour Office in Geneva, Switzerland.

BAt international level, she was a member of the European Universities' Association's Institutional Evaluation Project (IEP) from 2008 to 2014 and in that capacity she was involved in the evaluation of universities in Portugal, Italy, Hungary, Slovakia, Turkey, Bosnia-Herzegovina and Romania.

She is interested in educational policy and practice at all levels of education. Her publications include a three volume collection of extracts from Irish educational documents from earliest times to the 1990s, which she co-edited with Kenneth Milne. (Irish Educational Documents Vols. 1, 2 and 3 published by the Church of Ireland College of Education, 1987, 1992 and 1994). She has published more than 50 articles, reports and papers as well as presenting at numerous conferences nationally and internationally.

In 2018 she was admitted as a member of the Royal Irish Academy.

Publications

Multi-Denominational Schools in the Republic of Ireland 1975-1995 Paper delivered by Professor Áine Hyland, Professor of Education, University College, Cork, Ireland, at a Conference Education and Religion organised by C.R.E.L.A. at the University of Nice. 21–22 June 1996

A Review of the Structure of Initial Teacher Education Provision in Ireland. Background Paper for the International Review Team May 2012. Higher Education Authority.

Irish educators
Academics of University College Cork
Living people
People associated with the National College of Ireland
Year of birth missing (living people)
Members of the Royal Irish Academy